This article details the fixtures and results of the UAE national football team in 1976. 

The national team was represented at the 4th Arabian Gulf Cup, held in Qatar. The UAE drew with Kuwait, which was a big improvement on the previous 6-0 loss in 1974.

Schedule

4th Arabian Gulf Cup

4th Arabian Gulf Cup

4th Arabian Gulf Cup

4th Arabian Gulf Cup

4th Arabian Gulf Cup

4th Arabian Gulf Cup

National team
National team
1976
United